The Honda VT series comprises motorbikes with two-cylinder V engines. More sporting V engined bikes are given "VTR" model numbers. Four-cylinder V-engined Hondas are designated VF or VFRs, while Honda motorbikes with inline engines mostly belong to the CB and CBR series.

Just because an engine is listed within a series or sub-series doesn't mean it is directly related to another within the same category.

Honda's 90-Degree VT Series
 VT125C
 VT250
 VT250F
 VTR250

Honda's 52-Degree VT Series
 Honda VT400C Shadow
 Honda NV400
 Honda NT400 Bros
 VT500
 VT500C
 VT500E
 VT500FT
 Honda XL600V Transalp
 VT600C VLX
 VT600CD VLX
 Honda NT650 Hawk (US) Bros (Global)
 Honda XL650V Transalp
 Honda DN-01 (700cc)
 VT750C
 VT750CD
 VT750C03
 VT750DC
 Honda VLX1300 Shadow
 Honda VLX1800 Shadow

Honda's 45-Degree VT Series
 VT700C
 VT750
 Honda XL700V Transalp
 VT800
 VT1100C
 VT1100C2
 VT1100C2
 VT1100C3
 VT1100T

References 

VT series